Thérèse Desqueyroux is the most famous novel by François Mauriac.

Plot
The novel is set in the Landes, a sparsely populated area of south-west France covered largely with pine forests.  As it opens, a court case is being dismissed. The main character, the titular Thérèse, has been tried for poisoning her husband Bernard by overdosing him with Fowler's Solution, a medicine containing arsenic.  Despite strong evidence against her, including prescriptions she forged, the case has been dropped; the family closed ranks to prevent scandal and Bernard himself testified in her defence.  On the journey home, Thérèse reflects at length on her life so far, trying to understand what brought her to continue poisoning her husband after she observed him taking an accidental overdose.  She suggests that her actions were part of an "imperceptible slope", caused in part by the pressures of motherhood and marriage and the stifling life of a Catholic landowner's wife in 1920s rural France.  However, neither Thérèse nor the narrator provides a clear explanation for her behaviour.

Thérèse assumes that she will be able to leave her husband quietly now that the case is over.  Instead, Bernard announces that she is to live at his family house, in an isolated spot in the pine forest, at Argelouse.  He effectively confines her there, giving out that she suffers from a nervous complaint, and making the occasional public appearance with her to quell any gossip.  His concern is that the forthcoming marriage of his younger sister Anne, to a suitor approved by the family, is not prevented by any scandal.  He allows Thérèse no company other than unsympathetic servants, keeps their daughter away from her, and threatens to send her to prison for the poisoning if she does not cooperate.  Thérèse lives mainly on wine and cigarettes, falls into a passive stupor and takes to her bed. When she is ordered to attend a dinner party for Anne, her fiancé and his family, she does so, but her emaciated appearance shocks the guests. Bernard decides that the scandal will never be fully forgotten unless Thérèse is allowed to disappear without controversy.  He promises she can leave after Anne's wedding, and moves back to Argelouse to supervise her recovery.  The wedding over, he takes Thérèse to Paris and bids her farewell.  There will be no official separation and no divorce, and she has an allowance to live on.  She is free to go.

Analysis
The book is characterised by some unusual structural devices, including a long internal monologue which often switches perspective, revealing the thoughts of several characters. The vast majority of characters in the book are seen as quite unpleasant people; Thérèse's father is revealed to be a callous sexist more concerned with protecting his political career than looking after his daughter, while Bernard himself is portrayed as an emotionally unavailable man obsessed solely with hunting and serving the needs of the family. As in much of Mauriac's work, physical imperfection signifies moral destitution and most characters have some sort of flaw – phrases such as "hard black nails", "short bow legs" and "fat little Hippolitus" all describe various male characters, just within the first few chapters.

Thérèse herself is proud of her intelligence and self-perceived wisdom, as well as apparently having an unrequited crush on former childhood friend and sister-in-law Anne – at one point destroying a love letter from Anne to a local Jewish man. Critics have suggested that this could parallel with Mauriac's own struggles with sexuality.

Mauriac commented on the novel's structure in an interview in The Paris Review in 1953.  He said: " ... in Thérèse Desqueyroux I used some devices that came from the silent films; lack of preparation, the sudden opening, flashbacks. They were methods that were new and surprising at that time".

Sequels
The character of Thérèse recurs in other works by Mauriac, including The End of the Night, Thérèse and the Doctor and Thérèse at the Hotel.

Development history
In 1925, Mauriac asked his brother Pierre for documents about the trial in Bordeaux, in 1906, of Madame Canaby, who had attempted to poison her husband.  She was acquitted, but convicted of forging prescriptions.

Literary significance and reception
The novel is Mauriac's best known work, and was described as "outstanding" in the biography that accompanied his Nobel Literature Prize citation.  On 3 June 1950 Le Figaro named it as one of the winners of the "Grand Prix des meilleurs romans du demi-siècle", a prestigious literary competition to find the twelve best French novels of the first half of the twentieth century.  Nominations were judged by a distinguished French literary jury chaired by Colette, and the winners were included the following year in a specially published and illustrated collection.  In 1999 it came 35th in a national poll to find the 100 best French works of the 20th century.

Mauriac also attracted negative criticism.  Jean-Paul Sartre famously attacked his work in 1939, accusing him of denying his characters free will and, like God, imposing external fates and moral judgements on them.  He singled out the character of Thérèse Desqueyroux as an example of this; Mauriac had recently published The End of the Night, stating in its preface that he wished to "save" Thérèse, prompting Sartre's attack.

Adaptations
The novel was filmed as Thérèse Desqueyroux by Georges Franju in 1962, with Emmanuelle Riva as Thérèse. Riva reprised the role in the 1966 TV film La fin de la nuit, directed by Albert Riéra.

In 2010 it was announced that Claude Miller was to remake the film, with Audrey Tautou as Thérèse. The film was released at the 2012 Cannes Film Festival on May 27 2012.

In 2015, Nicole Garcia played Thérèse in the French TV film La fin de la nuit, directed by Lucas Belvaux.

See also
Le Monde 100 Books of the Century

References

1927 French novels
Catholic novels
Novels set in Aquitaine
French novels adapted into films
Éditions Grasset books